David Reich may refer to:

David Reich (geneticist), American geneticist and Harvard Medical School professor
David L. Reich, American hospital president, anesthesiologist, and professor